A ball pit is a recreational play area filled with small plastic balls, typically used for children's play areas or in sensory therapy. Children can jump, dive, and play in the pit, which can be a fun and safe way to encourage physical activity, creativity, and socialization skills.

Ball Pit

 
They are typically marketed as recreation and exercise for children.

They are often found at nurseries, carnivals, amusement parks, fun centers, fast-food restaurants, and large video arcades, frequently incorporated into larger play structures such as mazes, slides and jungle gyms. They may be rented for parties, and smaller versions are sold for home use.

History
Eric McMillan created the first ball pit in 1976 at SeaWorld Captain Kids World in San Diego, as a result of his experience at Ontario Place.

Urban legends
Beginning in the late 1990s, a number of urban legends arose about children being severely injured or killed in ball pit encounters with vipers or hypodermic needles. There is no truth to these stories.

In popular culture
In China Miéville's short story "The Ball Room" (Looking for Jake), the ghost of a child who died in a ball pit haunts a local IKEA-like store.

In the Johnny Bravo episode "Johnny Meets Donny Osmond", Donny pushes Johnny into a fast-food ball pit, where he comes across a young boy who claims to have been there since the age of five.

In the Rugrats episode "Piggy's Pizza Palace", the Rugrats jump on a costumed pig named Piggy as an act of revenge to get Angelica's tickets back. It causes the ball pit structure to split open and the balls fall out all over the restaurant.

In season 3 episode 14 ("The Einstein Approximation") of the TV series The Big Bang Theory, Sheldon seeks inspiration in a ball pit at a mall, then hides from Leonard, who spends a good amount of time and effort trying to retrieve Sheldon from the pit.

In 2014, a YouTube vlogger under the name Roman Atwood made a video of transforming the living room of his home into a massive ball pit, intended as a prank for his girlfriend who had returned from a trip. He later collaborates with another vlogger, Freddie Wong, to create a comedy video involving giant ball pit and "ball monster" prank.

In 2016, a pop-up "ball pit bar" opened in San Francisco.

See also
Inflatable castle
DashCon, for the "extra hour with the ball pit" meme

References 

Play (activity)
Entertainment
Balls
Sensory toys